Julius Thalmann (born 7 April 1960) is a Swiss former professional racing cyclist. He rode in three editions of the Tour de France.

References

External links
 

1960 births
Living people
People from Entlebuch District
Swiss male cyclists
Sportspeople from the canton of Lucerne